The Jaro Evangelical Church is a Baptist church in Jaro, Philippines, affiliated with the Convention of Philippine Baptist Churches. 

Jaro Evangelical Church's inception from the beginning is catalyst to the foundation (which it shares a strong association with) of Central Philippine University, the first Baptist and second American university in the Philippines and in Asia, an institution of higher learning founded through the benevolent grant of an American industrialist and philanthropist, John D. Rockefeller in 1905.

History
On February 28, 1900, Dr. Eric Lund and Braulio Manikan of the American Baptist Missionary Union arrived in Iloilo City followed by Rev. Charles Briggs and founded the church at Castilla Street in Jaro City, Iloilo.

At the same time, Lund and Manikan corroborated by Placido Mata, Vicente Doronila and Pascual Araneta translated the Bible to Hiligaynon vernacular – Ang Bagong Katipan (New Testament) and Ang Daan nga Katipan (Old Testament).

In 1904, Rev. Charles Briggs opened out stations in Pavia, La Paz and Hinaktakan. In 1905, Lund helped organized the Baptist Training School and the Jaro Industrial School (now Central Philippine University), spread to Capiz where they established a Home School (now Filamer Christian University).

In 1923, a new church was built at the Plaza Jaro (the present site). Lastly, in 1950, a newer church (the present one) was built on the same site under Rev. Elmer Fridell. In 1952, the church was finished and was dedicated with Dr. Peter Hugh Lerrigo, the former president of Central Philippine University where he delivered his dedication message.

During the World War II, the church was used by the Japanese Imperial Army. After the war, services resumed in the church where Rev. Vaflor and United States Army Chaplain Weavers preached.

Beliefs 
The Church has a Baptist confession of faith and is a member of the Convention of Philippine Baptist Churches.

See also
 Protestantism in the Philippines
 Convention of Philippine Baptist Churches

References

History of the Philippines (1898–1946)
1901 establishments in the Philippines
Buildings and structures in Iloilo City
Protestantism in the Philippines
Churches in Iloilo
Baptist churches in the Philippines

External links
Official website